Simin Han is a town east of Tuzla, Bosnia and Herzegovina. It has a school, a mosque, and a youth soccer training centre. Its neighboring towns are Gornja Tuzla and Slavinovići.

History
During the Bosnia Eyalet of the Ottoman Empire, people would use this place as an overnight sleeping place. In the 17th century, people started populating the town, building houses and other buildings, including a mosque; the mosque is still standing today and shortly renovated. The origin of the name Simin is Turkish, and means "Silvery".

Demographics 
According to the 2013 census, its population was 2,278.

Sports
The dominant sport in Simin Han is football. It has one football training centre, owned by local club Sloga Simin Han; a youth academy; it has a fierce rivalry with clubs FK Mladost Gornja Tuzla and Proleter Slavinovići. Basketball is also a popular sport in the town, and the main training centre is OKK Sloboda Tuzla.

References

Populated places in Tuzla